The 1953 Milan–San Remo was the 44th edition of the Milan–San Remo cycle race and was held on 19 March 1953. The race started in Milan and finished in San Remo. The race was won by Loretto Petrucci.

General classification

References

1953
1953 in road cycling
1953 in Italian sport
1953 Challenge Desgrange-Colombo
March 1953 sports events in Europe